The dactylus is the tip region of the tentacular club of cephalopods and of the leg of some crustaceans (see arthropod leg). In cephalopods, the dactylus is narrow and often characterized by the asymmetrical placement of suckers (i.e., the ventral expansion of the club) and the absence of a dorsal protective membrane.  In crustaceans, the dactylus is the seventh and terminal segment of their thoracic appendages.  In certain instances the dactylus, together with the propodus, form the claw.

The term dactylus means "finger" in Greek.

References

Cephalopod zootomy
Crustacean anatomy